Elmar Schloter (6 March 1936 – 23 May 2011) was a German organist and conductor.

References

External links 
 Kurzbiografie auf www.musica-antiqua-da-caccia.de
 
 

1936 births
2011 deaths
German classical organists
German male organists
German conductors (music)
German male conductors (music)
Recipients of the Cross of the Order of Merit of the Federal Republic of Germany
Male classical organists